Turcoaia is a commune in Tulcea County, Northern Dobruja, Romania. It is composed of a single village, Turcoaia.

A village called Iglița used to exist in the area; after being destroyed, its territory was folded into that of Turcoaia.

References

Communes in Tulcea County
Localities in Northern Dobruja